The 1966 United States Senate election in Wyoming was held on November 8, 1966. First-term Republican Senator Milward Simpson, who was first elected in the 1962 special election, declined to seek re-election because of his declining health. Governor Clifford Hansen won the Republican primary and faced Democratic Congressman Teno Roncalio in the general election. Despite the strong performance by Republicans nationwide, and the strong Republican victory in the gubernatorial election, the race was quite close. Hansen ended up winning, defeating Roncalio with 52% of the vote.

Democratic primary

Candidates
 Teno Roncalio, U.S. Congressman from Wyoming's at-large congressional district

Results

Republican Primary

Candidates
 Clifford Hansen, Governor of Wyoming
 Bud Kinney, perennial candidate

Results

General election

Results

References

Wyoming
1966
1966 Wyoming elections